The 2011 NASCAR Nationwide Series was the thirtieth season of semi-professional stock car racing in the United States. The season included thirty-four races, beginning with the DRIVE4COPD 300 at Daytona International Speedway and ending with the Ford 300 at Homestead-Miami Speedway. During the 2010 season, NASCAR announced a few notable calendar changes, including race additions at Iowa Speedway and Chicagoland Speedway, and the removal of Gateway International Raceway from the schedule. Jack Roush won the Owners' Championship, while Ricky Stenhouse Jr. of Roush Fenway Racing won the Drivers' Championship with a second-place finish at the final race of the season. Ford won the Manufacturers' Championship with 212 points.

Teams and drivers

Complete schedule

Limited schedule

Team changes

 Turner Motorsports ran four full-time teams during the season and switched to Chevrolets. They also used Hendrick Motorsports engines as well as getting technical support from Kevin Harvick, Inc.

Discontinued/suspended operations
 Germain Racing discontinued their Nationwide Series team this season because Michael Annett and sponsor Pilot Travel Centers moved to Rusty Wallace Racing. They, however, ran the No. 15 Toyota at Daytona with Todd Bodine sponsored by Tire Kingdom. Germain transferred the owners points of the No. 15 over to Rick Ware Racing who ran the No. 15 Ford for rookie Timmy Hill starting at Phoenix. Hill could not run Daytona because he was under 18.
 Richard Childress Racing has merged its Nationwide program with Kevin Harvick, Inc.
 Roush Fenway Racing discontinued the No. 98 car due to Paul Menard leaving for KHI.  The owner points were sold to Go Green Racing.
 Due to a lack of sponsorship, Baker Curb Racing suspended all operations indefinitely for the season, though there are reports of the team putting together a car for Canadian J. R. Fitzpatrick for Daytona
 Due to the new rules package for the Nationwide Series, K-Automotive Motorsports decided to shut down its Nationwide program and focus on running Brian Keselowski in the Sprint Cup Series for Rookie of the Year.
 Stratus Racing Group failed to run a car during the season because owner/driver Derrike Cope moved back to Jay Robinson Racing after a 4-year hiatus from the team.

Driver changes
 Aric Almirola drove for JR Motorsports this season in the 88 car.
 Colin Braun was released by Roush-Fenway Racing because the team was focusing on sponsorship for Carl Edwards, Ricky Stenhouse Jr. and Trevor Bayne for this season.
 Elliott Sadler drive for KHI during 2011 in the 2 car.
 Sam Hornish Jr. drove the No. 12 Dodge for 10 races due to the No. 77 Sprint Cup team being renumbered to the No. 22 in The Cup Series.

Entering the series
 Travis Pastrana was to make his NASCAR debut with Pastrana-Waltrip Racing, running 7 races this season with sponsorship from Boost Mobile, beginning at Indianapolis. However, due to injuries sustained at X Games XVII, his debut was delayed until 2012.
 Pastrana-Waltrip Racing intended to field Ryan Truex for 20 races for ROTY honors, but the team was forced to pull out of the championship due to a lack of sponsorship.
 ARCA driver Timmy Hill ran for Rookie of the Year honors with Rick Ware Racing.
 Jennifer Jo Cobb was a ROTY campaigner with 2nd Chance Motorsports and planned to run the full season. However, she got into an heated argument with team owner Rick Russell at Bristol, and ran a few races with Rick Ware Racing.

Changed teams
 Paul Menard moved to Kevin Harvick, Inc., after two years with Roush-Fenway Racing.
 Michael Annett, along with sponsor Pilot Travel Centers, moved to Rusty Wallace Racing this season, after two seasons with Germain Racing, replacing Brendan Gaughan, who is heading back to the Camping World Truck Series with that team.
 Justin Allgaier joined Turner Motorsports this season, after two years with Penske Racing.
 Trevor Bayne signed with Roush-Fenway Racing during the 2010 season after Diamond Waltrip Racing was unable to renew their contract and has now signed on for a full year with the team. He'll drive the No. 16 vacated by Colin Braun.
 Eric McClure and sponsor Hefty left Team Rensi Motorsports after two years to drive for TriStar Motorsports in 2011
 Brian Scott was released by Turner Motorsports during the 2010 season and finished the season with RAB Racing. Scott moved to Joe Gibbs Racing to drive their No. 11 Toyota with Kevin Kidd as crew chief.
 Kenny Wallace drove for RAB Racing this season, after three seasons with Jay Robinson Racing.
 Mike Bliss leaves Key Motorsports to drive for TriStar Motorsports in the No. 19 Chevrolet.
 Scott Wimmer returned to full-time status for 2011, driving Key Motorsports' No. 40 Chevrolet.
 Jeremy Clements drove his No. 51 full-time in 2011, leaving Davis Motorsports.
 Shelby Howard left ML Motorsports before the Aaron's 312. David Stremme and Dennis Setzer filled the seat.
 Reed Sorenson was released by Turner Motorsports before the Kansas Lottery 300. Sprint Cup driver Brian Vickers replaced him for Kansas, Charlotte, and Texas.
 Derrike Cope moved back to Jay Robinson Racing after 4 years of driving his own car.

Exiting the series
 Brendan Gaughan returned to the Camping World Truck Series this year with Germain Racing, bringing sponsor South Point Hotel, Casino & Spa along with him.

Rookie entries
2010 NASCAR K&N East Series Champion Ryan Truex was intended to run 10–20 races with Pastrana-Waltrip Racing, and was the early favorite to win Rookie of the Year. However, sponsorship issues sidelined Truex's bid for the title, forcing him to sit out most of the season. He was later tabbed by Joe Gibbs Racing to drive their No. 20 Toyota late in the season. Blake Koch, returning to NASCAR after sitting 2010 out due to losing sponsorship, was to drive the No. 81 alongside veteran Donnie Neuenberger. However, Koch picked up sponsorship from Daystar Television Network, which eventually expanded to sponsoring Koch for the full year. Rick Ware Racing development driver Timmy Hill was 17 years old when the Nationwide Series hit Daytona, and thus was not approved to run until the next week in Phoenix. Jennifer Jo Cobb's rookie season was hampered by a fallout with 2nd Chance Motorsports owner Rick Russell over starting and parking, and she briefly moved to Rick Ware Racing before moving her own team up to Nationwide with limited success. Charles Lewandoski intended to make ten races for TriStar Motorsports, but ended up running some start and park efforts with Key Motorsports.

The RotY lead would be contested mostly by Hill and Koch, who were tied heading into the season finale at Homestead. However, Hill prevailed over Koch and became the youngest Rookie of the Year in series history.

2011 calendar

Calendar changes

 Gateway International Raceway was removed from the schedule.
 Nashville Superspeedway's second race moved to late July.
 Iowa Speedway and Chicagoland Speedway received a second race date.
 Michigan International Speedway's race moved from August to June.
 Kentucky Speedway's race date moved to July.
 Phoenix International Raceway's spring race moves from April to February.
 The fall race at Auto Club Speedway was discontinued due to low sales and was replaced by the aforementioned Chicagoland June race.

Changes

Rule changes
The 2011 series seen a rule change aimed at limiting the impact of drivers racing in multiple series. According to a story reported by NASCAR.com on January 11, 2011, drivers were allowed to earn points in only one of NASCAR's three national series in a given season. This is enforced on NASCAR's annual license application form, which now requires drivers to indicate the series championship for which they wish to compete. This had the effect of preventing full-time Cup drivers from competing for the Nationwide Series title, although they were still  able to run in all Nationwide races.  Ineligible drivers still accumulated owner points for team standings that determine the Owner's Championship and exemptions (top 30 full-time teams that have attempted every race are guaranteed to start the race). This and other changes were officially announced by NASCAR president and CEO Brian France on January 26.

France also announced major changes to the points system in all three national touring series. Effective during the season, the winner of each race received 43 points, with a one-point decrease for each successive finishing position (42 points for second, 41 for third, and so on). The race winner also received three bonus points, with single bonus points being awarded to all drivers who led a lap and to the driver who led the most laps. This means that a race winner was assured of either 47 or 48 points, while a second-place finisher earned at most 44.

The closed-loop fueling system previously introduced in the Truck Series, which eliminates the catch can man from the pit crew, debuted in all three national series.

Results and standings

Races

Drivers' standings 

(key) Bold - Pole position awarded by time. Italics - Pole position set by final practice results. * – Most laps led.

 1 – Post entry, driver and owner did not score points.
 2 – Conway originally registered for Sprint Cup points, but switched to Nationwide at Nashville.
 Kyle Busch was suspended from competing in the second Texas race due to crashing out championship contender Ron Hornaday Jr. during a caution at the 2011 WinStar World Casino 350K earlier that weekend. He was replaced by Denny Hamlin.

Manufacturer

See also
 2011 NASCAR Sprint Cup Series
 2011 NASCAR Camping World Truck Series
 2011 ARCA Racing Series
 2011 NASCAR Canadian Tire Series
 2011 NASCAR Corona Series
 2011 NASCAR Stock V6 Series

References

NASCAR Xfinity Series seasons